Muhammet Akdeniz is a Turkish freestyle wrestler competing in the 79 kg division. He is a member of Ankara İlbank.

Career 
In 2022, he won one of the bronze medals in the men's 79 kg event at the 2022 European Wrestling Championships held in Budapest, Hungary. Muhammet Akdeniz reached the semifinals by beating Stanislav Novac of Moldova 6-1 in the first round and Saifedine Alekma of France 5-3 in the quarterfinals. In the semifinals, he lost to the Greek Georgios Kougioumtsidis, and in the third place match he defeated the Latvian Alans Amirovs 8-4 to win the bronze medal. He won the silver medal in the men's 79 kg event at the 2021 Islamic Solidarity Games held in Konya, Turkey. He competed in the 79kg event at the 2022 World Wrestling Championships held in Belgrade, Serbia.

Achievements

References

External links 
 

1995 births
Living people
Turkish male sport wrestlers
European Wrestling Championships medalists
Islamic Solidarity Games competitors for Turkey
Islamic Solidarity Games medalists in wrestling
21st-century Turkish people